Iris Smith (born October 15, 1979) is an American freestyle wrestler who won the 2005 world title in the 72 kg division. A daughter of Brent James and Betty Smith, she Attended Dougherty Comprehensive High School in Albany, Georgia, where she played basketball and served as student council president. Smith has three brothers, Dominique, Kenderson and Westley, and four sisters, Cheavelia, Tyuana, Nicole, and Sasha. She holds a rank of Staff Sergeant in the U.S. Army. She missed the 2001 World Championships because it overlapped with her military training program.

References

1979 births
Living people
African-American sport wrestlers
World Wrestling Championships medalists
21st-century African-American sportspeople
20th-century African-American sportspeople